Milner Gray may refer to:
Milner Gray (politician) (1871–1943),British politician
Milner Gray (designer) (1899–1997), British industrial designer